The Lithuanian A Lyga 2007 was the 18th season of top-tier football in Lithuania. The season started on 7 April 2007 and ended on 10 November 2007. 10 teams participated with FBK Kaunas winning the championship.

League standings

Results

First half of season

Second half of season

Top goalscorers

See also 
 2007 LFF Lyga

References 

LFF Lyga seasons
1
Lith
Lith